Issues (written as "•issues•" on the album's cover) is the debut studio album by American metalcore band Issues. Released on February 18, 2014 on Rise Records, the album debuted at number 9 on the Billboard 200, selling over 22,000 copies in its first week. The album was produced by Kris Crummett, Matt Malpass, and the group's keyboardist and disc jockey Tyler "Scout" Acord.

Background and recording
The album's initial release was originally in November 2013, however had been pushed back to February 2014. It is the band's first release with current drummer Josh Manuel after Case Snedecor's departure in early 2013. The band released a teaser for the track, "Stingray Affliction" on November 19, 2013. The official track listing was released on December 7, 2013. The album's first single, "Stingray Affliction" was released on December 18, 2013, along with the album's artwork.

The album was released as a music download, CD and as an LP through Rise Records.

On November 18, 2014 the deluxe edition was released, featuring the Diamond Dreams.

Critical reception

At Alternative Press, Brian Kraus rated the album four stars out of five stars as he praised the album's DJ-based breakdowns and called the album a mixture of metalcore and post-hardcore with elements of nu metal. Gregory Heaney of AllMusic gave the album a considerably lower score as he criticized the album's sound as the two genres (being metalcore and mainstream pop) saying, "can be a little hard to wrap your head around" and called it a new variant of the old nu metal genre. However, he praised its efforts on some tracks. Sputnikmusic's Robert Lowe expressed negativity against the album, giving it the lowest rating. He criticized the album's use of throwing in random genres with metalcore, including R&B, hip hop and nu metal and stated this failed miserably, calling it a mixture of Limp Bizkit and Justin Bieber elements, and even went as far as to say, "it could be the worst album ever." The album was included at number 16 on Rock Sounds "Top 50 Albums of the Year" list. The album was included at number 43 on Kerrang!s "The Top 50 Rock Albums Of 2014" list.

Track listing

Personnel

Issues
 Tyler Carter – clean vocals, additional unclean vocals on "Life of a Nine", "The Langdon House" and "Disappear (Remember When)"
 Michael Bohn – unclean vocals
 AJ Rebollo – guitars
 Tyler "Scout" Acord – turntables, keyboards, synthesizers, programming
 Josh Manuel – drums, percussion
 Skyler Acord – bass

Additional artists
Heather Acord – choir
Jimmie Herrod – choir
Sonya Kaye – choir
Veronica Moss – choir
Nylo – vocals on track 10

Artwork
Peter Schreve – artwork, design
Caitlin Brookins – photography

Production
Issues – composer
Kris Crummett – executive producer, producer, engineer, mixing, mastering
Matt Malpass – executive producer, producer
Nylo – production

References
 Citations

Sources

External links

Issues at YouTube (streamed copy where licensed)

2014 debut albums
Issues (band) albums
Rise Records albums
Albums produced by Kris Crummett